The Pelourinho (Portuguese for "pillory") is an important monument in the city of Cidade Velha in the south of Santiago, Cape Verde. The historic centre of Cidade Velha is an UNESCO World Heritage Site since June 2009. It is a white marble column in Manueline style, standing at the main square of the town. It was a symbol of municipal power, and of slavery: rebellious slaves were punished publicly at the pelourinho. 

Erected in 1512 or 1520, it is one of the oldest monuments of Cape Verde. It was restored at the end of the 1960s.

See also
List of buildings and structures in Santiago, Cape Verde

References

Buildings and structures in Santiago, Cape Verde
Buildings and structures completed in 1520
Ribeira Grande de Santiago
Pillories
Portuguese colonial architecture in Cape Verde
Individual instruments of torture